Khattuni (Xottane)  is a rural locality (a selo) in Vedensky District, Chechnya.

Administrative and municipal status 
Municipally, Khattuni is incorporated as Khattuninskoye rural settlement. It is the administrative center of the municipality and is the only settlement included in it.

Geography 

Khattuni is located on the left bank of the Khatuni River, a right tributary of the Dzhalka River.

The nearest settlements to Khattuni are Elistanzhi in the south-east, Makhkety in the south-west, Tevzana in the west, and Agishty in the north-west.

Name 
The name "Khottanye" translates roughly from Chechen as "swampy" or "muddy".

History 
In 1944, after the deportation of the Chechen and Ingush people and the Chechen-Ingush ASSR was abolished, the village of Khattuni was renamed to Konkhidatli, and settled by people from the neighboring republic of Dagestan. From 1944 to 1957, it was a part of the Vedensky District of the Dagestan ASSR.

In 1958, after the Vaynakh people returned and the Chechen-Ingush ASSR was restored, the village regained its old Chechen name, Khottanye.

Population 
 2002 Census: 1,572
 2010 Census: 2,626
 2019 estimate: 2,828

According to the results of the 2010 Census, the majority of residents of Khattuni were ethnic Chechens.

Infrastructure 
Khattuni hosts several important buildings, including a mosque and a high school.

References 

Rural localities in Vedensky District